Maharaja Ishan Chandra Manikya of the Manikya Dynasty was the king of Tripura from 1849 to 1862

Biography
He was the son of Krishna Kishore Manikya. His son Nabadwipchandra Dev Burman was a noted Indian sitarist and Dhrupad singer and the father of composer S. D. Burman and grandfather of another composer R. D. Burman.
Thus, he is the great grandfather of the famous Bollywood composer R. D. Burman.

He was married to three Manipuri queens who were not of royal origin. Muktabali of Moirangthem, Chanu Jatiswari of Keisham and Chandreswari of Khumanthem.
Upon his death in 1862, his brother Bir Chandra Manikya assumed the throne instead of his own sons.

See also
Manikya dynasty
Tripura (princely state)

References

Kings of Tripura
History of Tripura
People from Agartala

Kokborok playback singers